Independent National Alliance of Angola (ANIA) is a political party in Angola. ANIA was founded on April 11, 1995. The party is a member of the coalition New Democracy. It is led by former National Liberation Front of Angola (FNLA) youth leader, José Fernando Fula 'Tó Zé'.

References

Political parties in Angola